In the Cyrillic alphabet, Апас or  АПАС may refer to:
 in the Tatar language, Apastovo 
 in Russian, the Androgynous Peripheral Attach System, a spacecraft docking system